Anna Nagar is a state assembly constituency in the Indian state of Tamil Nadu. Its State Assembly Constituency number is 21. It includes the locality, Anna Nagar, which is in Chennai. It is part of the Chennai Central parliamentary constituency. Anna Nagar was one of 17 assembly constituencies to have VVPAT facility with EVMs in 2016 Tamil Nadu Legislative Assembly election. It is one of the 234 State Legislative Assembly Constituencies in Tamil Nadu.

Overview
As per orders of the Delimitation Commission, No. 21 Anna Nagar Assembly constituency is composed of Ward 66-70 & 73-75 of Greater Chennai Corporation.

Members of the Legislative Assembly

Election results

2021

2016

2011

2006

2001

1996

1991

1989

1984

1980

1977

See also 
C. N. Annadurai

References 

 

Assembly constituencies of Tamil Nadu
Memorials to C. N. Annadurai
Chennai district